Engineering in the Americas before the arrival of Christopher Columbus was advanced in agriculture, hydrology, irrigation systems, transportation, mechanical engineering, civil engineering and astronomy. In addition Native Americans made extensive use of fire to change the landscape and to create open areas for farming and hunting. Examples of pre-Columbian engineering from different indigenous civilizations can be found across North and South America.

North America 

Pueblo Structures
Hohokam Canals
Chaco Canyon
Tenochitlan Flood Gates
Teotihuacan
Serpent Mound
Cahokia Mounds

South America 

Inca road system
Nazca Lines
Machu Picchu
Sacsayhuaman
Chavin/Inca canals
Tiwanaku
Chan Chan
Anden
Zenu canals and drains

See also

Inca Empire
Incan agriculture
Kuelap
Paracas culture
Nazca culture
Caral

References
 

Americas-related lists
History of engineering
Pre-Columbian cultures